Diploprora is a genus of flowering plants from the orchid family, Orchidaceae. It contains two recognized species, native to Asia:

Diploprora championii (Lindl.) Hook.f. - India, Assam, Bhutan, Bangladesh, Myanmar, Sri Lanka, Thailand, Vietnam,  Fujian, Guangxi, Hong Kong, Taiwan, Yunnan
Diploprora truncata Rolfe ex Downie - Thailand, Arunachal Pradesh

It has been established, that Diploprora truncata is more closely related to Malleola baliensis, which is a synonym of Robiquetia aberrans (Schltr.) Kocyan & Schuit, than to the type species of the genus Diploprora championii. Thus, the genus is polyphyletic.

See also 
 List of Orchidaceae genera

References 

 Pridgeon, A.M., Cribb, P.J., Chase, M.A. & Rasmussen, F. eds. (1999). Genera Orchidacearum 1. Oxford Univ. Press.
 Pridgeon, A.M., Cribb, P.J., Chase, M.A. & Rasmussen, F. eds. (2001). Genera Orchidacearum 2. Oxford Univ. Press.
 Pridgeon, A.M., Cribb, P.J., Chase, M.A. & Rasmussen, F. eds. (2003). Genera Orchidacearum 3. Oxford Univ. Press
 Berg Pana, H. 2005. Handbuch der Orchideen-Namen. Dictionary of Orchid Names. Dizionario dei nomi delle orchidee. Ulmer, Stuttgart

External links 

Orchids of Asia
Vandeae genera
Aeridinae
Taxa named by Joseph Dalton Hooker